William Rutter may refer to:

 William Rutter (MP)
William J. Rutter, biochemist